Bile is a greenish-yellow alkaline fluid secreted from the liver of most vertebrates.

Bile may also refer to:

People
Abdi Bile (born 1962), Somali middle-distance runner
Mingo Bile (born 1987), Angolan footballer
Moni Bilé, Cameroonian musician
Pastor Micha Ondó Bile (born 1952), Equatorial Guinean cabinet minister and ambassador
William I of Bimbia (birthname Bile), 19th century Cameroonian ruler

Places
Bile River, Guam
Birecik, Turkey, a city called Bile during the Crusades
Bile, Luhansk Oblast, an urban-type settlement in Luhansk Oblast, Ukraine
Bile, Odesa Oblast, the only village on Snake Island in Ukraine
Lake Bile, a lake in the Odesa Oblast in Ukraine

Other uses
Belenus, a god of Celtic mythology
Bile (Irish legend), a legendary ancestor of the Irish people
Bile (band), a New York industrial metal band
Bile language, a Southern Bantoid Jarawan language of Nigeria
Black bile, a humor in ancient and pre-modern medicine
Yellow bile, a humor in ancient and pre-modern medicine
Birmingham Laptop Ensemble (BiLE)

See also

Biles, a surname